The Clarence Schmalz Cup is the Ontario Hockey Association's Junior "C" ice hockey championship and championship trophy. The champions of the Provincial Junior Hockey League (PJHL) are awarded the Cup.  The PJHL was formed in 2016 from the former 8 provincial leagues that previously competed in a tournament, commonly called the All-Ontario Championships, to determine the winner of the Cup.

Tubby Schmalz
The trophy was named in honour of Clarence "Tubby" Schmalz, an administrator from Walkerton, Ontario. He served as the Ontario Hockey Association president from 1969 to 1972. In 1974, the Major Junior A program began operating independently of the association as the Ontario Major Junior Hockey League; Schmalz became the league's first commissioner, a post he held until 1978. He served as vice-chairman of the Canadian Amateur Hockey Association from 1979 to 1981, and as chairman in 1981. The association renamed the OHA Junior C Cup in his memory in 1982, then collaborated with Schmalz's family in the creation of a commemorative trophy case in the lobby of the Walkerton Community Centre.

Competing leagues
Provincial Junior Hockey League (PJHL) 2016 to Present

Former competing leagues
Central Ontario Junior C Hockey League (COJCHL) 1986-2016
formerly Central Lakeshore Junior C Hockey League (CLJHL) 1965-1986
formerly Quinte-St. Lawrence Junior C Hockey League (QSLJHL) 1965-1986
Empire B Junior C Hockey League (EBJCHL) 1996-2016
formerly Eastern Ontario Junior C Hockey League (EOJCHL) 1989-1996
Georgian Mid-Ontario Junior C Hockey League (GMOHL) 1994-2016
formerly Georgian Bay Junior C Hockey League (GBJCHL) 1970-1994
formerly Mid-Ontario Junior C Hockey League (MOJCHL) 1976-1994
formerly Central Junior C Hockey League (CJCHL GMO) 1973-1976
Great Lakes Junior C Hockey League (GLJHL) 1970-2016
formerly Border Cities Junior Hockey League (BCJHL) 1968-1970
formerly Bluewater Junior C Hockey League (BJCHL) 1964-1968
Intercounty Junior C Hockey League (IJCHL) 1966-1970
Midwestern Junior C Hockey League (MWJCHL) 2013-2016
Niagara & District Junior C Hockey League (NJCHL) 1974-2016
Southern Ontario Junior Hockey League (SOJHL) 2012-2016
Suburban Junior C Hockey League (SJCHL) 1961-1970
Western Ontario Junior C Hockey League (WJCHL) 1988-2016
formerly Grey-Bruce Junior C Hockey League (GBJCHL) 1980-1988
formerly Central Junior C Hockey League (CJCHL Western) 1967-1980
formerly Western Junior C Hockey League (IntJCHL) 1966-1970

Clarence Schmalz Cup Champions

Championship series
Bolded is winner of Clarence Schmalz Cup as PJHL and OHA champion.

Most championships by team

7
Essex 73's (2015, 2009, 2005, 2002, 1978, 1977, 1975)

5
Grimsby Peach Kings (2012, 2011, 2004, 2003, 1940)
Lakeshore Canadiens (2022, 1995, 1994, 1992, 1985)

4
Collingwood Greenshirts (1953, 1952, 1951, 1950)
Lakefield Chiefs (2018, 2014, 2000, 1987)
Newmarket Redmen (1970, 1959, 1958, 1956)

3
Glanbrook Rangers (1999, 1998, 1997)
Penetang Kings (2007, 2006, 1984)

2
Alliston Hornets (2008, 2010)
Ayr Centennials (2017, 2016)
Bowmanville Eagles (1981, 1979)
Dunnville Terriers (1983, 1976)
Leamington Flyers (1980, 1972)
Napanee Raiders (2019, 1993)
New Hamburg Firebirds (1967, 1963)
Orangeville Crushers (1990, 1938)
Parry Sound Brunswicks (1957, 1966)
Whitby Jr. Dunlops (1960, 1946)

George S. Dudley Trophy Super "C" Champions
This trophy was awarded during the 1970s to a new class of junior hockey known as Super "C".  The teams that competed were deemed to be from centres too small for Junior "B" but yet too big for Junior "C".  The cities that competed for it: Barrie, Woodstock, Kitchener, Owen Sound, and Brantford; struggled throughout that decade to find Junior "B" leagues that suited their needs.  While waiting, these teams generally played "down" in the Junior "C" or "D" level and awaited the Super "C" playoffs.   The class was disbanded by 1976 as the only teams eligible for the championship had found homes in Junior "B".

References

External links
Schmalz Cup Page
OHA Junior C

Ice hockey tournaments in Canada
Ice hockey in Ontario
Ontario Hockey Association